Leendert Frans van Dis (born 20 August 1944) is a retired Dutch rower. Together with Harry Droog he won a silver medal in the double sculls event at the 1968 Summer Olympics.

References

1944 births
Living people
Dutch male rowers
Olympic rowers of the Netherlands
Rowers at the 1968 Summer Olympics
Olympic silver medalists for the Netherlands
Rowers from Amsterdam
Olympic medalists in rowing
Medalists at the 1968 Summer Olympics
20th-century Dutch people
21st-century Dutch people